Rachel Scott was a student murdered in the Columbine High School massacre.

Rachel Scott may also refer to:

Rachel Scott, character in The Last Ship (TV series)
Rachel Wacholder, married name Rachel Scott, American model and beach volleyball player
Rachel Scott (women's education reformer) née Cook (1848–1905), Scottish women's education reformer, based in Manchester, who organised and promoted equality for women
Rachel V. Scott, an American journalist who works for ABC News